Sijua plagalis is a species of moth of the family Thyrididae. It is found in Cameroon.

The wingspan of the female of this species is 20 mm.

References

Thyrididae
Moths described in 1917
Moths of Africa